Bank of China Tower may refer to:

 Bank of China Tower (Hong Kong)
 Bank of China Tower, Shanghai

See also 
Bank of China Building (disambiguation)